"Just Fine" is a song by the American singer Mary J. Blige. It was written by Blige, Terius "The-Dream" Nash, Jazze Pha and Tricky Stewart for her eighth studio album, Growing Pains (2007), while production was helmed by Pha and Stewart. It was released as the album's lead single in October 16, 2007. The song peaked at number 22 on the US Billboard Hot 100 and number 16 on the UK Singles Chart, while also topping the US Hot Dance Club Play chart.

Critically acclaimed, "Just Fine" was nominated in the Best Female R&B Vocal Performance category at the 50th Annual Grammy Awards, held February 2008, as well as the Grammy for Best Remixed Recording, Non-Classical at the 51st Grammy Awards in February 2009. In addition, the song was ranked 41st on Rolling Stones list of the 100 Best Songs of 2007. Plus it was featured on the 2008 compilation album Now That’s What I Call Music! 27.

 Background 
Blige said about the song:
"That song was written based on me having a good day. You know, I can have 20 bad days. I can have as many bad days as anyone. But I choose to say, 'I'm just fine.' Right now. So it's OK to have those days. So instead of coming with something ungrateful to the universe, how about I come with something first that's says, 'You know what? It's OK. Enjoy this day if you're having a great day."

 Remixes 
The official remix was produced by Swizz Beatz called "Just Fine (Treat 'Em Right Remix)", which samples "Treat 'Em Right" by Chubb Rock and features Lil Wayne and Swizz Beatz on background vocals. There are four versions of this remix: The main remix version has Lil Wayne's verse on the beginning after the intro, the second remix version features a verse by Precise, along with Lil Wayne, the third remix version has Lil Wayne's verse on the near end of the song, and the fourth remix version is a no rap version, omitting Lil Wayne's verse.

The second official remix of "Just Fine" features Lil' Mama, which was a pre-order only track on iTunes when the album was released. An alternate music video for this remix was produced.

 Music video 
The music video for "Just Fine" was directed by Chris Applebaum and released on October 8, 2007. It premiered on BET and MTV's TRL on October 25, 2007. On September 7, 2008, the video was nominated for Best Hip-Hop Video at the 2008 MTV Video Music Awards. On December 20, 2008, VH1 ranked it 39th on its list for the "Top 40 of 2008".

 Formats and track listings UK CD promo "Just Fine" (Main Version)
 "Just Fine" (featuring Lil Mama)
 "Just Fine" (Moto Blanco Radio Mix)
 "Just Fine" (Moto Blanco Club Mix)
 "Just Fine" (Moto Blanco Dub)UK CD single "Just Fine" (3:58)
 "Just Fine" (Moto Blanco remix) (8:04)International CD promo'
 "Just Fine" (Radio Edit) (3:58)
 "Just Fine" (Main Version) (4:18)
 "Just Fine" (Instrumental) (4:18)

Charts

Weekly charts

Year-end charts

Certifications

References

External links
 

2007 singles
Mary J. Blige songs
Music videos directed by Chris Applebaum
Songs written by Mary J. Blige
Songs written by The-Dream
Songs written by Tricky Stewart
Song recordings produced by Tricky Stewart
Song recordings produced by Kuk Harrell
Song recordings produced by Jazze Pha
Songs written by Jazze Pha
2007 songs
Geffen Records singles